Lestijärvi is a municipality of Finland. There is also the Lake Lestijärvi in the area.

Lestijärvi is located in the province of Western Finland and is part of the Central Ostrobothnia region.

Neighbouring municipalities are Halsua, Kinnula, Kokkola, Perho, Reisjärvi, Sievi and Toholampi.

The municipality is unilingually Finnish.

Demographics
This small, isolated rural area suffers from depopulation as in many other similar parts of Finland. The local community provide a subsidy of €1,000 p.a. to families who have a child and stay in the community. Other areas of Finland have similar schemes, such as providing very cheap land. After several years, the subsidy seems to be increasing the number of children in the community.

People born in Lestijärvi
Arthur Aspelin (1868 – 1949)
Heimo Rekonen (1920 – 1997)

See also
 Finnish national road 58

References

External links
 
 Municipality of Lestijärvi – Official website 

 
Populated lakeshore places in Finland